CSJ or C.S.J. may refer to:

 Campaign for Social Justice, a group which began campaigning for civil rights in Northern Ireland in 1964
 Centre for Social Justice
CSJ Alliance
CSJ Awards
 Chemical Society of Japan
 Congregation of the Sisters of Saint Joseph
 Cultic Studies Journal predecessor to the Cultic Studies Review
 Superior Council of the Judiciary of Colombia
 ICAO airline designator for Castle Aviation
 Jung Chan-Sung, a South Korean mixed martial artist
 Critical social justice, a term used by critics of social justice movements